Burnaby—Coquitlam was a federal electoral district in British Columbia, Canada, that was  represented in the House of Commons of Canada from 1953 to 1968.

This riding was created in 1952 from parts of Burnaby—Richmond riding.

It was abolished in 1966 when it was redistributed into Burnaby—Seymour, Fraser Valley West and New Westminster ridings.

Members of Parliament

Election results

See also 

 List of Canadian federal electoral districts
 Past Canadian electoral districts

External links 
Riding history from the Library of Parliament

Former federal electoral districts of British Columbia